The 2015 Lehigh Mountain Hawks football team represented Lehigh University in the 2015 NCAA Division I FCS football season. They were led by tenth-year head coach Andy Coen and played their home games at Goodman Stadium. They were a member of the Patriot League. They finished the season 6–5, 4–2 in Patriot League play to finish in third place.

Schedule

Source: Schedule

References

Lehigh
Lehigh Mountain Hawks football seasons
Lehigh Mountain Hawks football